George Luther (May 3, 1823December 23, 1884) was a Michigan politician.

Early life
Luther was born on May 3, 1823 in Bristol, Rhode Island. In 1841, Luther moved to Grand Rapids, Michigan. Later, he moved to Lamont, Michigan.

Career
Luther was a merchant. On November 4, 1862, Luther was elected to the Michigan House of Representatives where he began representing the Ottawa County 2nd district on January 7, 1863. On February 25, 1865, resigned from this position.

Personal life
Luther was married to Elizabeth Seymore.

Death
Luther died on December 23, 1884. He was interred at Maplewood Cemetery in Lamont.

References

1823 births
1884 deaths
American merchants
Burials in Michigan
People from Bristol, Rhode Island
People from Ottawa County, Michigan
Republican Party members of the Michigan House of Representatives
19th-century American politicians
19th-century American businesspeople